Kanyaka may refer to:

Kanyaka (magazine), an Indian women's magazine
Kanyaka (film), a 1976 Indian film directed by J. Sasikumar
Sri Kanyaka Parameshwari Temple, a temple in Shadnagar, Andhra Pradesh, India
 Kanyaka Kingdom, an ancient Indian kingdom
Kanyaka, South Australia (disambiguation), articles associated with the town and locality